Lorna Buntrock Herseth (April 5, 1909 – September 8, 1994) was the Secretary of State of South Dakota from 1972 to 1978.

Personal life

Herseth was born in Columbia, South Dakota on April 5, 1909. Her parents, Albert and Ida Yeske Buntrock, were German immigrants. She was the youngest of 11 children. Herseth attended Northern State Teacher's College and earned a teaching credential after two years of study.

She married Ralph Herseth, who served as Governor of South Dakota from 1959 to 1961, on December 23, 1937. They had dated for nine years prior to getting married. Together they had three children, Karen, Connie, and Ralph Lars.

Their son, Ralph Lars Herseth, served in the South Dakota State Legislature. Their granddaughter, Stephanie Herseth Sandlin, served in the United States House of Representatives. Herseth served as mentor to Sandlin. During her life, Herseth lived in Houghton, South Dakota and in Pierre, South Dakota. She was a Lutheran. She died on September 8, 1994 and was buried in Houghton Cemetery.

Career
After college, Herseth taught in the Brown County public schools as well as in urban schools. In 1936, Herseth was elected as Brown County Superintendent of Schools. For seven years, she served on Brown County's Reorganization School Board. She later served on the Selby School Board.

Four years after Ralph's death, activists approached Herseth about running for state office herself.  She twice was elected Secretary of State of South Dakota, and served from 1973–1979.

Public service
Herseth served on the board of directors for the Brown County Red Cross and as the state director of the Easter Seal Society for Crippled Children and Adults.

References

Secretaries of State of South Dakota
Schoolteachers from South Dakota
American women educators
First Ladies and Gentlemen of South Dakota
School board members in South Dakota
Women in South Dakota politics
People from Brown County, South Dakota
American people of German descent
20th-century American politicians
20th-century American women politicians
1909 births
1994 deaths